Muleba is one of the six districts of the Kagera Region of Tanzania. It is bordered to the north by Bukoba Urban and Bukoba Rural districts, to the south by Biharamulo District, to the east by Lake Victoria and to the west by Ngara and Karagwe districts.

According to the 2012 Tanzania National Census, the population of the Muleba District was 540,310, from 424,287 in 2002, and 284,137 in 1988, with an estimated population of 639,902 in 2017. There are 166 villages, and 135,645 households in Muleba.

Wards 

The Muleba District is administratively divided into 31 wards:

 Bisheke
 Biirabo
 Buganguzi
 Bulyakashaju
 Bumbile
 Burungura
 Goziba
 Ibuga
 Ijumbi
 Ikondo
 Izigo
 Kabirizi
 Kagoma
 Kamachumu
 Karambi
 Kasharunga
 Kashasha
 Kibanga
 Kimwani
 Kishanda
 Kyebitembe
 Magata Karutanga
 Mazinga
 Mubunda
 Muhutwe
 Muleba
 Muyondwe
 Ngenge
 Nshamba
 Ruhanga
 Rushwa

References

Districts of Kagera Region